Navigators of Dune is a 2016 science fiction novel by Brian Herbert and Kevin J. Anderson, set in the Dune universe created by Frank Herbert.  It is the third book in their Great Schools of Dune prequel trilogy, which itself is a sequel to their Legends of Dune trilogy.

Background
Set nearly a century after the events of 2004's Dune: The Battle of Corrin, the novel continues to chronicle the beginnings of the Bene Gesserit, Mentat and Suk Schools, as well as the Spacing Guild, all of which are threatened by the independent anti-technology forces gaining power in the aftermath of the Butlerian Jihad. The Great Schools of Dune trilogy, first mentioned by Anderson in a 2010 blog post, chronicles the early years of these organizations, which figure prominently in the original Dune novels.

In a 2009 interview Anderson stated that the third and final novel would be titled The Swordmasters of Dune, but by 2014 it had been renamed Navigators of Dune. On July 27, 2015, Anderson previewed the cover of Navigators of Dune on Twitter and noted its 2016 release. The novel was published on September 13, 2016.

A prequel short story called "Dune: Red Plague" was released on Tor.com on November 1, 2016.

References

2016 American novels
2016 science fiction novels
Dune (franchise) novels
Novels by Kevin J. Anderson
Novels by Brian Herbert
Tor Books books